Santiago Patiño (born 10 March 1997) is a Colombian footballer who plays as a forward for San Antonio FC in the USL Championship.

Having played college soccer for the FIU Panthers, he was selected third overall in the 2019 MLS SuperDraft by Orlando City.

Club career

Youth and college 
Patiño was born in Medellín, Colombia. When he was 9 years old, Patiño's parents split and he chose to live with his father, playing in the junior teams of the football clubs his father transferred to. When he was 12 years old, Patiño moved to Orlando, Florida with his mother where he played for Orlando City’s Development Academy and Freedom High School.

He played college soccer at Florida International University from 2015 to 2018, scoring 37 goals in 69 matches. He was a three time All-Conference USA selection and named MAC Hermann Trophy semifinalist in his junior year.

Prior to his professional deal, Patiño spent the summer of 2016 in the NPSL with Kraze United and also played in the PDL with both SIMA Águilas and Seattle Sounders U23.

Orlando City 
Before they selected him in the draft, Orlando City had tried to sign Patiño as a Homegrown Player but the move was controversially blocked by MLS. The team's Executive VP of soccer operations Luiz Muzzi continued to argue the case throughout the Combine and events leading up to the draft stating "We feel like the league did us wrong on this one." Orlando eventually decided to draft him with their #3 overall pick despite the selection being seen as a reach with Orlando City head coach James O'Connor describing the move as "a message to all our other homegrowns." He made his professional debut on 16 March 2019 in a 3–1 defeat to Montreal Impact, coming on as a 74th minute substitute and assisting Dom Dwyer's goal in stoppage time. He scored his first professional goal 7 July 2019, entering as an 81st minute substitute and scoring with his first touch of the game from a corner to put Orlando 2–1 up against Philadelphia Union. Orlando ended up conceding a 90th minute equalizer to tie 2–2. He had his contract option declined as part of the club's end of season roster moves in December 2020.

Loan to Cimarrones de Sonora 
On 21 August 2020, Patiño joined Mexican team Cimarrones de Sonora in Liga de Expansión MX for the rest of the year. He made his debut for the club as a substitute on 7 September in a 2–0 win over Dorados, making his first start on 16 September in a 1–0 defeat to Atlante. He scored his first goal on 22 September 2020, a 90th minute conciliation goal in a 2–1 defeat to Correcaminos.

San Antonio FC 
On 6 January 2021, Patiño signed as a free agent with USL Championship team San Antonio FC. He debuted for the club on 2 May, 2021 in a 3-0 win over Colorado Springs, in which Patiño scored a hat-trick. Patiño scored in the 101st minute of the 2022 USL Championship Western Conference Playoffs Final and played in the USL Championship Final on 13 November 2022. In that game, Patiño scored two goals and led his team to a 3-1 victory against Louisville City FC; for his efforts Patiño was named the USL Championship Final Most Valuable Player.

International 
In August 2019, Patiño received his first international call up to the Colombia U23 training camp ahead of the Tokyo 2020 Olympics.

Personal life
Santiago is the son of former professional goalkeeper Milton Patiño. His uncle, Jairo Patiño, also played football and was capped internationally for Colombia.

Career statistics

Club

References

External links
 

1997 births
Living people
Colombian footballers
Colombian expatriate footballers
Association football forwards
SIMA Águilas players
Seattle Sounders FC U-23 players
Orlando City SC players
Orlando City SC draft picks
Colombian expatriate sportspeople in the United States
Expatriate soccer players in the United States
Major League Soccer players
FIU Panthers men's soccer players
All-American men's college soccer players
Footballers from Medellín
Cimarrones de Sonora players
Colombian expatriate sportspeople in Mexico
Expatriate footballers in Mexico